The Moradabad–Ambala line (also known as Moradabad–Ambala main line) is a railway line connecting  in the Indian state of Uttar Pradesh  and  in Haryana. The line is under the administrative jurisdiction of Northern Railway.

History
The Scinde, Punjab & Delhi Railway completed the  –Ambala–– line in 1870 connecting Multan (now in Pakistan) with Delhi.

Electrification
The Ambala– sector was electrified in 1996–98 and –Roorkee in 2003–04. The Roorkee–Mordabad sector was electrified around 2005–06.

The Ambala–Laksar– sector is an electrified double-line.

Sheds and workshops

Ambala has an outstation shed for Shakurbasti WDS-4 locos. Jagadhari has a carriage and wagon workshop and a bridge workshop.

Speed limit
The Ambala––Lucknow–Pratapgarh–Mughalsarai line is classified as a "Group B" line and can take speeds up to 130 km/ h.

Passenger movement

Railway reorganisation
Around 1872, the Indian Branch Railway Company was transformed into Oudh and Rohilkhand Railway. Oudh and Rohilkhand Railway was merged with East Indian Railway Company in 1925.

The Government of India took over the Bengal and North-Western Railway and merged it with the Rohilkhand and Kumaon Railway to form the Oudh and Tirhut Railway in 1943.

In 1952, Eastern Railway, Northern Railway and North Eastern Railway were formed. Eastern Railway was formed with a portion of East Indian Railway Company, east of Mughalsarai and Bengal Nagpur Railway. Northern Railway was formed with a portion of East Indian Railway Company west of Mughalsarai, Jodhpur Railway, Bikaner Railway and Eastern Punjab Railway. North Eastern Railway was formed with Oudh and Tirhut Railway, Assam Railway and a portion of Bombay, Baroda and Central India Railway. East Central Railway was created in 1996–97. North Central Railway was formed in 2003.

References

External links
 Trains at Moradabad
 Trains at Roorkee
 Trains at Saharanpur
 Trains at Ambala Cantonment

5 ft 6 in gauge railways in India
Railway lines in Uttar Pradesh
Rail transport in Haryana
Rail transport in Uttarakhand
Railway lines opened in 1886

Transport in Ambala